Mercy Hospital Joplin, formerly known as St. John's Regional Medical Center, is a hospital in Joplin, Missouri, USA. The hospital is famous for suffering devastating damage in the 2011 Joplin tornado. The original storm-ravaged building was demolished in 2013. Following a succession of temporary structures, the hospital reopened in a new location in 2015.

History

According to the hospital, it was founded on October 24, 1896, by Mother Mary Sullivan, and the Sisters of Mercy founded in Ireland for this work around the world.   Appoline A. Blair is sometimes credited as playing a philanthropic role in the founding of St John's.  The facility was expanded in 1968 to include two connecting buildings of seven and nine floors.

On May 22, 2011, the hospital was seriously damaged by a tornado from the tornado outbreak sequence of May 21–26, 2011. Five patients were killed inside the hospital due to electrical failure and surviving patients were evacuated from the health facility, which sustained major structural damage. One of the hospital's towers was rotated four inches on its foundation. In the immediate aftermath of the tornado, the Missouri National Guard established a field hospital at Joplin Memorial Hall.

Mere hours after one of the deadliest recorded tornadoes in U.S. history hit Joplin, the Missouri Medical Assistance Team (DMAT) started working to create a plan to help the survivors. The following Wednesday, DMAT deployed their 8,000 square foot field hospital to temporarily replace the destroyed hospital. Six days after the tornado, on May 29, 2011 St. John's medical staff gave medical treatment to their community in the BLU-MED field hospital. This temporary hospital is now the home of the Kansas City University-Joplin School of Osteopathic Medicine.

The existing hospital was structurally unsafe and was eventually demolished.  Temporary buildings were constructed nearby for work to continue supporting the community.  One week after the tornado, St. John's (now known as Mercy) announced they would rebuild.  Mercy has rebuilt the hospital at Interstate 44 and Hearnes Boulevard; it opened in 2015, replacing the facility destroyed by the tornado. There is also an auxiliary facility on the northeast side.

References

External links

Buildings and structures in Joplin, Missouri
Hospital buildings completed in 1968
1896 establishments in Missouri
2015 establishments in Missouri
2011 disestablishments in Missouri
Joplin, Missouri